Son of Babylon is a 2010 Iraqi drama film directed, produced and co-written by Mohamed Al-Daradji, Variety's Middle Eastern Filmmaker of the year 2010.

The film was developed through The Sundance Institute and was selected as Iraq's official entry for the Best Foreign Language Film at the 83rd Academy Awards, but it didn't make the final shortlist.

Plot
The film is set initially in Northern Iraq, 2003, two weeks after the fall of Saddam Hussein. Ahmed, a 12-year-old boy begrudgingly follows in the shadow of his grandmother. On hearing news that prisoners of war have been found alive in the South, she is determined to discover the fate of her missing son, Ahmed's father, who never returned from the Gulf war in 1991. From the mountains of Kurdistan to the sands of Babylon, they hitch rides from strangers and cross paths with fellow pilgrims, on all too similar journeys. Struggling to understand his grandmother's search, Ahmed follows in the forgotten footsteps of a father he never knew.

Cast
 Shazada Hussein
 Yasser Talib

Awards
 60th Berlin International Film Festival, 2010 winner of the Amnesty Film Award & Peace Prize
 Karlovy Vary International Film Festival, 2010 winner of the NETPAC Award
 Raindance Film Festival, 2010, winner Best International Feature Film
 Hawaii International Film Festival, 2010, Grand Jury Prize Best Feature Film
 Edinburgh International Film Festival, 2010, Special Mention
 Cinema City IFF, Serbia 2010, Special Mention
 Zadar Film Forum, 2010, Best European Co-production

See also
 List of submissions to the 83rd Academy Awards for Best Foreign Language Film
 List of Iraqi submissions for the Academy Award for Best Foreign Language Film

References

External links

2010 films
2010 drama films
Iraqi drama films
2010s Arabic-language films
Films directed by Mohamed Al-Daradji